Zhou Xiaochuan (born 29 January 1948) is a Chinese economist. Zhou served as the Governor of the People's Bank of China from 2002 to 2018. 

Zhou previously served as vice governor of the People's Bank of China, director of the State Administration of Foreign Exchange, governor of China Construction Bank, and chairman of the China Securities Regulatory Commission. He retired in 2018.

Early life and education 
Born in Yixing, Jiangsu province, he was the son of Zhou Jiannan and Yang Weizhe. The elder Zhou was the head of Electric and Industrial Bureau of the North East district in 1949. He later became Vice Minister of First Department of Machinery Development in 1961. During the Cultural Revolution, Zhou Xiaochuan joined the Production and Construction Corps in Heilongjiang province while his father was persecuted.

Zhou Xiaochuan graduated from Beijing Institute of Chemical Technology (now Beijing University of Chemical Technology) in 1975 and received a Ph.D. degree in Automation and Systems Engineering from Tsinghua University in 1985. From 1987 to 1988, he was a visiting scholar at the University of California, Santa Cruz, US.

Career
During the early days of the Cultural Revolution, he worked at a Production and Construction Corps in Heilongjiang province from 1968 to 1972. He was sent to the Beijing Institute of Chemical Technology as a Gong Nong Bing Student (students selected from workers, farmers ,and military, a common practice of college admissions in the Cultural Revolution) in 1972. After graduating from college in 1976, he was assigned to the Beijing Research Center of Automation as an engineer studying large automation systems.

Between 1978 and 1985, he was studying for a master's degree in Industrial Application of System Engineering in China Academy of Machinery Science and Technology and Ph.D. in Science at Tsinghua University.

In 1986, he started working in the State Council of the People's Republic of China on economic restructuring as a member of the Economic Policy Group of the State Council and Deputy Director of the Institute of Chinese Economic Reform Research. He served as Assistant Minister of Foreign Trade from 1986 to 1989 and between 1986 and 1991, he was also a member of the National Committee of Economic Reform. Before the Tiananmen Square protests of 1989, Zhou was an associate and protégé of Zhao Ziyang, General Secretary of the Communist Party of China. In Pillbury's book, Zhou was one of the conservatives that rejected the Russian model of privatization and political reforms (favoured by reformers) and opted for maintaining CPC political control while allowing state-owned enterprises to be subjected to market reforms. State-owned enterprises were floated on the stock market, influenced with western corporate governance standards as well as transformed into national champions of the Chinese economy. China avoided SOE sold on the cheap to a select few who undoubtedly could become powerful Oligarchs like in the Russian economy.

Between 1991 and 1995, he was executive director and vice president of Bank of China. From 1995, he assumed the position of Administrator of State Administration of Foreign Exchange. From 1996 to 1998, he served both as Deputy Governor of the People's Bank of China and Administrator of the State Administration of Foreign Exchange.

During 1998 to 2000, he served as president of the China Construction Bank and oversaw the creation of asset-management companies charged with working out the banking system's bad debt. He also played a part in managing China's vast foreign exchange reserves.

From 2000 to 2002, Zhou was the chairman of the China Securities Regulatory Commission. While there, he earned the nickname Zhou "Bapi", Zhou "the flayer". He targeted corruption in listed companies, angering many small shareholders, who saw their shares fall. In July 2001, Zhou declared his intention to reduce state ownership in the stock market. The stock market quickly went into freefall, forcing him to abandon his plans that October. He emphasized the role of market mechanisms, worked to reduce red tape and aimed to protect retail investors.

People's Bank of China
In December 2002, he was appointed to his present position by Premier Zhu Rongji as governor of the People's Bank of China and also took over the position of chairman of monetary policy committee of the People's Bank of China from January 2003. In 2010, he was serving his second five-year term.

Zhou was in charge of clearing up some $865 billion of bad loans in the Chinese banking system. He had been under pressure from the finance ministers and central bankers of the G7 countries to revalue the renminbi and change its mechanism of setting exchange rate.

Zhou has published a dozen monographs and over one hundred academic articles in Chinese and international journals, including "Rebuilding the Relationship between the Enterprise and the Bank" and "Social Security: Reform and Policy Recommendations" and his book Marching toward an Open Economic System.

Financial crisis 
On 24 March 2009, Zhou gave a speech, "Reform the International Monetary System". He argued that the ongoing financial crisis was made more severe by inherent weaknesses of the current international monetary system and called for a gradual move towards using IMF special drawing rights (SDRs) as a centrally managed global reserve currency. He argued that it would address the inadequacies of using a national currency as a global reserve currency, particularly the Triffin dilemma, the dilemma faced by issuing countries in trying to simultaneously achieve their domestic monetary policy goals and meet other countries' demand for reserve currency. Zhou explained global currency diversification was needed because an over concentration of foreign assets denominated in the dollar may bring about undesired consequences. Zhou argued that it was regrettable that John Maynard Keynes's "farsighted" bancor proposal was not adopted at Bretton Woods in the 1940s.

Zhou also asserted China's increasing confidence in its own financial governance philosophies. He criticized Western leaders for letting their banking sectors go astray by loose regulations.

Third term 
In March 2013, Zhou was reappointed as the governor of People's Bank of China. His reappointment came as "China's newly installed political chiefs - headed by Communist Party general secretary Xi Jinping and Premier Li Keqiang." Earlier in Zhou's career, "as a protege of former Premier Zhu Rongji, [Zhou] helped draw up the blueprint to wean the economy off central planning."

During a 5 March 2013 meeting of the National People's Congress and the Chinese People's Political Consultative Conference, Zhou announced the People's Bank of China would deal with the "ramifications of the excessive money supply and will gradually control the new money supply" because of the 2008 fourth quarter financial crisis.

In September 2015, Zhou addressed the G-20 finance meeting in Ankara about the sharp, sustained drop in the Chinese stock market in 2015 and said that the "correction in the stock market is almost done."

In October 2017, Zhou named three reforms he believed were crucial for China's economic future: scrapping capital account controls, letting the market freely decide the yuan's value and embracing free trade and investment.

References

External links 

  Biography of Zhou Xiaochuan, Xinhuanet.

1948 births
Living people
Beijing University of Chemical Technology alumni
Businesspeople from Jiangsu
China Construction Bank people
Economists from Jiangsu
Governors of the People's Bank of China
Group of Thirty
People from Yixing
People's Republic of China economists
People's Republic of China politicians from Jiangsu
Tsinghua University alumni
Vice Chairpersons of the National Committee of the Chinese People's Political Consultative Conference